Bernard Madrelle (27 April 1944 – 25 September 2020) was a French politician. A member of the Socialist Party, he was the brother of Philippe Madrelle and the son of Jacques Madrelle, and was heavily active in the politics of Gironde.

Bernard Madrelle died of liver cancer in Blaye on 25 September 2020 at the age of 76.

References

1944 births
2020 deaths